Parliamentary elections were held in Hungary between 10 November and 11 December 1865. The Deák Party won a majority of the seats.

Results 

The Far-Left was a fraction of the Centre-left Party. They didn't have own membership or president

Aftermath
Later, after the joining of representatives from Transylvania and Croatia, the constitution of the Parliament was as follows:

Elections in Hungary
Election
Hungary
Elections in Austria-Hungary
Hungary
Hungary

hu:Magyarországi országgyűlési választások#1865